Cedar Crest College is a private liberal arts women's college in Allentown, Pennsylvania. At the start of the 2015-2016 academic year, the college had 1,301 undergraduate (628 traditional age, 673 adult) and 203 graduate students. Men may pursue any master's degree, bachelor's degree, certification, and certificate program offered through evening and weekend study and are welcome to study nursing and nuclear medicine by day.

Founded in 1867, the college is historically tied to the United Church of Christ, though it remains academically independent. It was previously known as the Allentown Female College and the Allentown College of for Women, before taking its current name in 1913.

Academics

The college's Bachelor of Arts and science programs span more than fifty majors.  The curriculum also includes programs in Pre-Law, Pre-Dentistry, Pre-Medicine and Pre-Veterinary Medicine.  In addition, Cedar Crest also offers master's degrees.  Undergraduate and graduate programs are also offered to adult students through the college's School of Adult and Graduate Education (SAGE).

Performing arts

Theatre 
The Theatre major at Cedar Crest College is a holistic major that encompasses both technical experience and performance in the theatre field. First Fridays are offered starting in a student's sophomore year to allow collaboration between those in the Performing Arts majors. In their senior year, students complete their Senior Capstone Project which is meant to feature their work cumulatively throughout their four years at the college.

The college stages four major stage productions which typically includes two musical productions and two straight plays. To feature the female students of the predominately women's college, productions chosen feature strong female leading, supporting, and ensemble roles with outside male performers from the surrounding Lehigh Valley community and beyond in any leading, supporting, or ensemble roles.

Faculty 
Faculty at the college include Technical Theatre Professor Kevin Gallagher and Professor Roxanne Amico.

Scholarships 
The department offers scholarships based on an audition on a Performing Arts Scholarship Day or submitted by video. These are typically $1,500 per year, four-year renewing scholarships, contingent on the student's participation in productions or classes within the Dance or Theatre majors.

Campus

Cedar Crest is located off Cedar Crest Boulevard at 100 College Drive on the western edge of Allentown. The  campus is adjacent to the city's Cedar Beach Park.

The campus includes buildings containing libraries, classrooms, administrative offices, pools, theaters, fitness studios, and dining halls. Additional classroom and faculty buildings include Hartzel Hall, Curtis Hall and Hamilton Boulevard Building. The college also has four residence halls:  Butz Hall, Moore Hall, Steinbright Hall and the upper level of Curtis Hall.

Cedar Crest's collection of 140 species of trees is designated as the William F. Curtis Arboretum, which is registered with the American Association of Botanical Gardens and Arboreta. The arboretum is named for the college's seventh president, who after purchasing the property in 1915,  beautified the campus by planting flowers, shrubs and trees from all over the world.

The campus is also the site of the Da Vinci Science Center, an independent science demonstration facility that opened in 2005.

The bell called "Dorothy" 
The bell is a sculpture by Toshiko Takaezu, located on the quad in a garden to honor Dorothy Gulbenkian Blaney's presidency.

Athletics

Cedar Crest, known athletically as the Falcons, competes in NCAA Division III athletics and has teams in basketball, cross country running, field hockey, lacrosse, soccer, softball, tennis, swim & dive, track & field, and volleyball. In addition, the Rodale Aquatic Center on campus is home to the college's swim & dive team.

During the 2007 season, the Cedar Crest Falcons tennis team placed 4th in the Pennsylvania Athletic Conference (PAC), now known as the Colonial States Athletic Conference (CSAC). The team also broke two school records, one for the most wins in a season (12) and one for the most PAC wins (7).  The team's record was 12–3. Coach Lynn Pigliacampi, at the time, was two games away from becoming Cedar Crest's winningest tennis coach.  Pigliacampi played both at local Easton Area High School (class of 1999), where she was undefeated, and at Division I Drexel University.  Her father, Jules Pigliacampi, is an assistant coach.  The United States Tennis Association named her Coach of the Year in 2008.

Cedar Crest's Falcons basketball team finished the 2008–09 season at 13-11 overall and 8–8 in the Colonial States Athletic Conference.  The team posted more conference victories than in the previous nine seasons combined, earning a CSAC playoff berth for the first time in a decade.  Head coach Valerie Donohue (Cedar Crest, '95) led the Falcons in tying the school record of 13 season wins set in 1998–99, the last time the team made the playoffs.  The 6th-seeded Falcons beat Centenary College's women in the 2009 tournament's opening round. Donohue was subsequently named the Colonial States Athletic Conference Women's Basketball Coach of the Year.

Cynthia L. Blaschak Softball Field 
In the spring of 1997, Cynthia L. Blaschak made a donation to Cedar Crest to build a softball field. This was done as part of her support of the new NCAA Division III varsity softball team that was beginning their season that year. Blaschak was a student athlete herself while attending Cedar Crest. She participated in both basketball and badminton.

Notable alumni
 Jane Amsterdam, editor of Manhattan, inc. and the New York Post
 Rita Kogler Carver, theater and lighting designer
 Judy McGrath, former CEO of MTV
 Dorothy Page, former actress
 Suzanne Fisher Staples, author and international news reporter
 Blenda Wilson, former California State University-Northridge and University of Michigan chancellor

Notable faculty
 Chrystelle Trump Bond, former American dancer, choreographer, and dance historian
 Anthony S. Caprio, former president, Western New England University
 Richard Druckenbrod, former theology professor and Pennsylvania German language scholar
 Fred Benjamin Gernerd, former Congressman and former Cedar Crest trustee
 Frank Reed Horton, first national president of Alpha Phi Omega service fraternity
 Diane Moyer, former Olympic field hockey player and current associate professor in the psychology department
 Barton C. Shaw, historian
 Pauline Tompkins, former president of Cedar Crest College

References

External links

 Official website
 Official athletics website

 
1867 establishments in Pennsylvania
Buildings and structures in Allentown, Pennsylvania
Educational institutions established in 1867
Education in Allentown, Pennsylvania
Private universities and colleges in Pennsylvania
Universities and colleges in Allentown, Pennsylvania
Women's universities and colleges in the United States